LFCS may refer to:

 Laboratory for Foundations of Computer Science, a research institute in Edinburgh, Scotland
 Linux Foundation Certified System, a certification program of the Linux Foundation